Mark Edward Wilson (born 6 October 1989) is an English rugby union coach and former player. He played as either a blindside flanker or at Number 8. On 14 February 2022, he announced his retirement  with immediate effect due to a problematic knee injury. Following his retirement he was reemployed by the Falcons as a coach.

Playing career

Club
Wilson was a product of the Newcastle Falcons Junior Academy and signed a professional contract after playing for Kendal RUFC in the national 3 level. He also spent some time on loan from Newcastle Falcons at Blaydon RFC in the national level 2 in his first year after becoming professional.  In March 2011 he was part of the Falcons team that were defeated by Gloucester in the final of the Anglo-Welsh Cup. Wilson started for the Newcastle side that defeated Bedford Blues in the 2012–13 RFU Championship final to achieve promotion back to the top flight.

In July 2019 it was announced that Wilson would be joining Premiership side Sale Sharks on a year-long loan following the relegation of Newcastle Falcons. Wilson returned to Newcastle for the 2020-2021 campaign and in total made 237 appearances for the club, scoring 42 tries.

International
Wilson represented both England Counties and England Students, and eventually played for the England senior side in a non-cap game against the Barbarians in May 2015. In May 2017 he was invited to a training camp with the senior England squad by coach Eddie Jones. On 10 June 2017 he made his Test debut starting against Argentina in the first test of their summer tour.

Wilson became a regular starter for England at the end of 2018, with Billy Vunipola and Sam Simmonds both ruled out because of injury, while Nathan Hughes had been suspended for foul play. In his first home start for England, Wilson claimed the Man of the Match award, as England beat South Africa by a single point during the 2018 Autumn Internationals. Wilson went on to start in all four of England's autumn internationals and was not subbed off during the series, winning the fan vote for the Quilter Internationals player of the series. It was during this series that Wilson scored his only International try on 17 November 2018 against Japan.

In September 2019 Wilson started for England in a warm-up game for the 2019 Rugby World Cup against Italy at St James' Park. He was selected by coach Eddie Jones as one of five back-row forwards for the tournament and played in the pool fixture against the United States and semi-final victory over New Zealand. He featured as a replacement coming on for Sam Underhill in the 59th minute of England's defeat to South Africa in the World Cup Final.

After the World Cup Wilson started for England against Wales during the 2020 Six Nations Championship which ended in England winning the tournament. His final International appearance was against Ireland in the 2021 Six Nations Championship.

International tries

Coaching Career

Newcastle Falcons 
Following his retirement from playing, Wilson was appointed a first team coach ahead of the 2022–23 season.

Honours
England
 Six Nations Championship: 2020
 Rugby World Cup runner-up: 2019

Newcastle Falcons
 RFU Championship: 2012-13
 Anglo-Welsh Cup runner up: 2010-11

References

External links
ESPN Profile

1989 births
Living people
English rugby union players
England international rugby union players
Rugby union flankers
Rugby union number eights
Rugby union players from Kendal
Newcastle Falcons players
Sale Sharks players
Alumni of Northumbria University